Sympathy for the Record Industry (also known as Sympathy Records or Sympathy 4 the R.I.) is a mainly independent garage rock and punk label formed in 1988 by John Mermis, known as Long Gone John. Notable artists who started on Sympathy and went on to gain mainstream success include The White Stripes, Hole, and The Electrocutes (the first Donnas incarnation).

History
Long Gone John is the owner and CEO. He is an avid record collector with more than 10,100 records in his collection. He also owns Necessaries Toy Foundation, a company that creates 18-24 inch figures. Long Gone John also operates Sympathetic Press, a book publishing company that prints books with rock and roll themes.

The first Sympathy release was the Lazy Cowgirls' Radio Cowgirl LP, which Long Gone John said he released as a "favor to the band." Sympathy has a catalog of more than 750 releases. The label's name is a play on the song "Sympathy for the Devil" by The Rolling Stones.

The roster has included Jack Off Jill, Scarling, Miss Derringer, The Muffs, Mumps, The (International) Noise Conspiracy, The Von Bondies, Rocket from the Crypt, Billy Childish, Turbonegro, April March, The Splatterheads, The Dwarves, Suicide, The Gun Club, Inger Lorre and Motel Shootout, Man or Astro-man?, The Red Planet Rocketts, Kim Salmon, Bored!, The Waldos, The Mystreated,  and Redd Kross.

On July 20, 2007, Long Gone John announced via his Myspace Blog that he was selling the label for "$625,000.00 or $700,000.00 if I don't like you."

In September 2011, John decided to start releasing records once again. He signed a distribution deal with Independent Label Distribution, then immediately put out a full-length LP as well as three 7-inches by The Ettes. The company now distributes new records as well as many older ones from John's catalog.

As of 2023, the label's website has been updated with a notice that states "Hope to get the rest off the catalog up and available soon…". Sympathy has continued to add releases in the early 2020s.

Discography

See also
 List of record labels
 List of Sympathy for the Record Industry artists

References

External links
 Tupica, Rich Long Gone John Interview
 Grunnen Rocks Discography
 Johnny Pontiac

American independent record labels
Record labels established in 1988
Garage rock record labels
Punk record labels
Indie rock record labels
Noise music record labels
Alternative rock record labels